Up the River is a 1930 American pre-Code comedy film directed by John Ford, and starring Claire Luce, Spencer Tracy and Humphrey Bogart. The plot concerns escaped convicts, as well as a female convict. It was the feature film debut role of both Tracy and Bogart. Despite Bogart being billed fourth (under top-billed Tracy, Claire Luce and Warren Hymer), Tracy's and Bogart's roles were almost equally large, and this is the only film in which they appeared together. Up the River is also Bogart's only film directed by John Ford.  Bogart's image is featured with Luce on some of the film's posters rather than Tracy's since Bogart was the romantic lead with Luce. Fox remade the film in 1938 starring Preston Foster and Tony Martin playing their roles.

Plot
Two convicts, St. Louis and Dannemora Dan, befriend another convict named Steve, who is in love with woman's-prison inmate Judy. Steve is paroled, promising Judy that he will wait for her release five months later. He returns to his hometown in New England and his mother's home.

He is followed there by Judy's former "employer", the scam artist Frosby. Frosby threatens to expose Steve's prison record if the latter refuses to go along with a scheme to defraud his neighbors. Steve goes along with it until Frosby defrauds his mother. At this moment St. Louis and Dannemora Dan break out of prison and come to Steve's aid, taking away a gun he planned to use on the fraudster, instead stealing back bonds stolen by Frosby. They return to prison in time for its annual baseball game against a rival penitentiary. The film closes with St. Louis on the pitcher's mound with his catcher, Dannemora Dan, presumably ready to lead their team to victory.

Cast
 Spencer Tracy as Saint Louis
 Claire Luce as Judy Fields
 Warren Hymer as Dannemora Dan
 Humphrey Bogart as Steve Jordan
 Morgan Wallace as Frosby (Uncredited)
 William Collier, Sr. as Pop
 Joan Lawes as Jean
 Bob Burns as Slim - Bazooka Player (Uncredited and in blackface)
 Edythe Chapman as Mrs. Jordan (Uncredited)
 Ward Bond as Inmate Socked by Saint Louis (Uncredited)

Production
Tracy had previously starred in two Warner Bros. shorts earlier the same year and Bogart had been an unbilled extra in a silent film, as well as starring in two shorts. Up the River is the first credited feature film for both actors, and is the only film that Tracy and Bogart ever appeared in together. Both had been cast in  The Desperate Hours in 1955, but neither would consent to second billing, so the role intended for Tracy went to Fredric March instead. Bogart is listed fourth after top-billed Tracy in Up the River but his role is equally large and his likeness is featured prominently on posters that did not include Tracy's image. This is the only film Bogart made with director John Ford. Nearly three decades later, Ford directed Tracy again in The Last Hurrah (1958).

After Up the River, Fox gave Spencer Tracy a contract as a leading man for the studio. Although Tracy's Fox films are highly regarded and considered classics ninety years later, very few made money when initially released so Tracy was eventually fired by Fox, then quickly snapped up by producer Irving Thalberg at Metro-Goldwyn-Mayer, where he became an extremely successful star.

References

Bibliography

External links
 
 
 

1930 films
1930 comedy films
American black-and-white films
American comedy films
Blackface minstrel shows and films
Films directed by John Ford
Films produced by William Fox
Fox Film films
1930s English-language films
1930s American films